Mrs. Pepperpot, known in Japanese as , is a Japanese anime television series, based on the children's books of  Mrs. Pepperpot by the Norwegian author Alf Prøysen. The series was broadcast on NHK General TV from April 4, 1983, to March 30, 1984, spanning a total of 130 10-minute episodes.

Plot
Mrs. Spoon Pepperpot lives in a small little village with her husband Fork. She wears a small magical teaspoon around her neck which every now and then shrinks her to the size of her teaspoon which does not shrink as well, and she must drag it along with her on her back when she gets shrunk. She always changes back to her original size after a certain amount of time. This special condition had its advantages — she can communicate with animals and enjoy wonderful adventures in the woods. This way she wins new and interesting friends on a regular basis. She is a good friend of Lily, a mysterious little girl who lives in the forest alone, she is also friends with a mouse family. She can not reveal her secret or show herself in the shrunk condition, which sometimes gets quite difficult. Her husband eventually finds out his wife's secret later on in the series.

Characters
 Mrs. Spoon Pepperpot: the main character of the series. She possesses a magic spoon which changes her size unexpectedly.
 Mr. Fork Pepperpot: Mrs. Pepper Pot's husband. He is a professional painter.  A stubborn and hotheaded character, he is initially unaware of his wife's secret.
 Fluffy: the Pepperpot family dog
 Cleo: the Pepperpot family cat
 Mr. and Mrs. Björn Halken: a mouse couple and their five mice children Dee, Dum, Fa, La, and Thump.  They live in a wall of the Pepperpot's house.
 Lily: a mysterious girl who lives in the forest with her pet mink Lou. Initially, she is the only one who knows Mrs. Pepperpot's secret, which she helps her keep.
 Andy, Buck, and Cappa: three young boys who often play together
 Parsley and Chip: a young girl and her baby brother
 Carl and Sara: a lumberjack and his wife
 Clara, Nellie, Samantha, and Ms. Jolebiene: friends of Mrs. Pepperpot
 Dr. Prøysen: the town doctor.  He enjoys giving shots.
 Jahn: the town mailman
 Mrs. Vienne and Aurélie: a well-to-do woman and her daughter
 Mint: a town store owner and Andy's father
 Mrs. Red Top, Chickie, and Chirpie: A mother hen and her two chicks
 Olina: a crow
 Michael: a fox
 King Jaw: a wolf
 Frogger: a frog
 Buzzy: a bee
 Black Jack: a one-eyed alley cat

Release
The series has been licensed in North America by Discotek Media who released it on Blu-ray in Japanese with English subtitles, and the English dub on April 26, 2022.

References

External links
 
 
 
 

1983 anime television series debuts
Discotek Media
Fantasy anime and manga
Pepper Pot, Mrs.
Japanese children's animated fantasy television series
NHK original programming
Pierrot (company)
Television series about size change
Television shows based on children's books